Bhalchandra Kadam (born 3 March 1971), popularly known as Bhau Kadam, is a Marathi theatre and film actor. He is known as a comedian, particularly when working in commercial Marathi cinema and drama. He began his acting career in 1991, when he started acting in dramas. He is well known for his roles in Fu Bai Fu. He has acted in more than 9 serials and has been involved in more than 500 drama shows.

Personal life 

Bhalchandra Kadam was born and brought up in Dombivli since childhood & now resides in Thane. Kadam has a wife named Mamata. They have three daughters and a son

Television
He is one of the best comedy actors in Marathi. He is well known for his skits in Fu Bai Fu, a Marathi standup comedy TV show on Zee Marathi. He also plays the main role, along with Nilesh Sable, in the comedy show Chala Hawa Yeu Dya, also aired on Zee Marathi. In this serial, he plays the character of Pappa, Jyotishi and many more characters. In almost every character, Bhau has been unique with his brilliant comic timing. His innocence while putting up hilarious comedy has earned him immense popularity among millions of Marathi fans. He also worked in a shows like Tuza Maza Jamena, Mala Sasu Havi and participated in almost every Zee Marathi Utsav Natyancha Awards show by performing his skits. Bhau also appeared as a guest on the Zee Marathi show Kanala Khada hosted by Sanjay Mone.

Movies
He was part of many Marathi movies. Timepass 2, Timepass, Sanngto Aika, Miss Match, Pune Via Bihar, Narbachi Wadi, Kokanastha, Chaandi, Mast Challay Aamcha and Balkadu are some of the successful movies in which he played an important role. He was also present in the Hindi movie Ferrari Ki Saawar. He will be appearing as a lead actor in the upcoming Marathi movie VIP Gadhav which is expected to be a hit considering mix of comedy, story with rural background and songs written by poet/lyricist Bashir Momin Kavathekar.

References

External links
 

Indian male film actors
Male actors in Marathi cinema
Living people
Male actors in Marathi theatre
Indian male comedians
1972 births
Indian Buddhists
20th-century Buddhists
21st-century Buddhists
Male actors in Marathi television
Marathi actors